Marco Maria Scolaris (born 1958) is a professional photographer and former amateur sportclimber. He lives in Turin, Italy.

His father is Marcello Scolaris, an expert in aeronautics who worked for the aircraft technology company Alenia in Turin, Italy.
 
As an active boulderer in his twenties Marco founded in 1988 the Federazione Arrampicata Sportiva Italiana, independent from the Club Alpino Italiano.  In 1990 it became a member federation of the Italian National Olympic Committee. Also in 1988 he became an international judge for UIAA Climbing and then a trainer for international judges in 1989.  As UIAA Climbing delegate he attended more than 40 events of the International Climbing and Mountaineering Federation (UIAA). From 1996 to 1997 he was the president of the UIAA Commission for Competition Climbing.  Together with Pascal Mouche he founded the UIAA Council for Competition Climbing and was the secretary general from 1997 to 2001 before becoming the president from 2001 to 2006.

He organized the separation of international sportclimbing competitions from the UIAA in 2006, founded the International Federation of Sport Climbing in 2007 and became the president.  He was re-elected in 2009 and 2013. Effectively he has been in charge since 1996 and there is no limitation in his terms.

References 

Italian rock climbers
1958 births
Living people